Gujrat (Punjabi and ), is a district of Punjab Province in Pakistan.

It is bounded on the northeast by Mirpur, on the northwest by the River Jhelum, which separates it from Jhelum District, on the east and southeast by the Chenab River, separating it from the districts of Gujranwala and Sialkot, and on the west by Mandi Bahauddin. District Gujrat is spread over an area of 3,192 square kilometres.

History

Ancient history
According to the British Imperial Gazetteer:

However the foundation of the capital, Gujrat, according to the Ancient Geography of India:

Islamic Rule  (Ghaznavid, Ghurid, Delhi, Suri, and Mughal Empires)
In 997 CE, Mahmud Ghaznavi, took rule over the Ghaznavid dynasty established by his father Sebuktegin. After defeating the Hindu Shahis, he conquered their kingdom entirely which included the Punjab region of modern day Pakistan.

After defeating the Ghaznavids, the Ghurids took over the region. They were in turn succeeded by the Sultanates of Delhi.

The Mughal emperor Akbar established Gujrat as a district along with many others when he began consolidating his rule over his vast empire. Jahangir, Akbar's son and successor, in his memoirs records the following information on Gujrat:

Revenue records have been preserved in the families of the hereditary registrars (kanungos), and these exhibit Gujrat as the capital of a district containing 2,592 villages, paying a revenue of 11.6 million. In 1605, the famous Sayyid Abdul Kasim received Gujrat as a fief from Akbar.

In 1707, with Aurangzeb's death, the decline of Mughal power began in the Punjab region. Nadir Shah occupied the Punjab including Gujrat during his invasion of the Mughal Empire in 1739. The area was captured by Punjabi Gakhar tribesmen from near the Rawalpindi area after the invasion.

Gujrat and Punjab as a whole was devastated further from the invasions of the Durrani Afghans (Pashtuns) under Ahmad Shah Durrani between 1748 and 1767. Durrani took direct control over Punjab after Mir Mannu, the Mughal governor of Punjab, died in 1753. Durrani would frequently cross the area for plunder and to fight the newly emerged Sikh Misls.

Sikh and British era
The Sikhs eventually took over most of northern Punjab after Ahmad Shah Durrani’s final invasion in 1767. The Sikhs under Gujjar Singh Bhangi took Gujrat after defeating the local Punjabi Ghakhars under Muqqarab Khan.

In 1798, the Bhangi leader Sahib Singh pledged allegiance to the Sukerchakia Misl of Ranjit Singh. By 1810, Ranjit Singh's armies captured the city from Bhangi forces, thereby extending the rule of the Sikh Empire to the city.

The Sikh empire declined following Ranjit Singh’s death in 1839. The British East India Company defeated the Sikhs between 1845 and 1846 during the First Anglo-Sikh War, reducing their power significantly. Two years later, the empire collapsed after the British EIC again decisively defeated the Sikhs at the Battle of Gujrat, thus ending the Second Anglo-Sikh War. The Sikh empire was entirely annexed and incorporated into the rule of the British EIC.

Demographics
According to the 2017 census, the population of the district is 2,756,289, of which 1,334,775 are males and 1,421,295 are females. 1,928,789 live in rural areas while 827,500 live in urban areas.

Religion 
As per the 2017 census, Islam is the dominant religion with 99.08% of the population while there is a minority of 0.77% Christians who live mainly in urban areas.

Language 
At the time of the 2017 census 96.50% of the population spoke Punjabi and 1.81% Pashto as their first language.

Administration
The district is administratively subdivided into four tehsils, these are:

 Gujrat
 Kharian
 Sarai Alamgir
 Jalalpur Jattan

Education
District Gujrat has a total of 1,475 government schools at primary and secondary level. Out of these public schools, 60 percent (889 schools) are for girls. According to the latest available data, 323,058 students are enrolled in the public schools while 10,581 teachers are working in these schools.

Notable people

Politicians
 
 
Aitzaz Ahsan, Pakistani barrister
Fazal Ilahi Chaudhry, President of Pakistan 19721977
 Chaudhry Pervaiz Elahi, former Chief Minister of Punjab & Federal Minister, Speaker of the Provincial Assembly of Punjab (from 16 August 2018 to present & from 1997 – June 2001). 
Chaudhry Zahoor Elahi, politician 
Moonis Elahi, Federal Minister for Water Resources  former MPA (2008-May2018) and Current MNA (Oct 2018 to present) of Gujrat
Chaudhry Muhammed Farooq, former law minister 
Nawabzada Ghazanfar Ali Gul, former Federal Minister of Pakistan
Mian Muhammad Afzal Hayat, former Chief Minister of Punjab and served as ambassador in different countries
Shujaat Hussain, former 16th Prime Minister of Pakistan on a temporary basis (30 June 2004 to 28 Aug 2004)
Chaudhry Jaffar Iqbal, Vice-President of PML-N Punjab
Qamar Zaman Kaira, former Federal Minister of Pakistan 
Mian Imran Masood, former MPA of Gujrat and Minister of Education Punjab.
Ahmad Mukhtar, Former Minister For Defence, Government of Pakistan
Yasmin Qureshi, British MP

Scholars
 
 
 Ismat Beg, scientist
 Faisal Masud, medical doctor

Military
 
 
Major Muhammad Akram, Nishan-e-Haider
Major Raja Aziz Bhatti, Nishan-e-Haider
Mohammad Shariff, Pakistan Navy Chief of Naval Staff and Chairman Joint Chiefs of Staff Committee
General Raheel Sharif, is a four-star rank army general, served as the 15th Chief of Army Staff of the Pakistan Army
Major Shabbir Sharif, Nishan-e-Haider
ACM Zaheer Ahmad Babar, is a four-star rank Air Chief Marshal, serving AirChief of Pakistan. Pakistan Air Force.

Poets
 
 
Orya Maqbool Jan, writer, columnist, analyst, former civil servant, and poet
Shareef Kunjahi, Punjabi writer and poet
Anwar Masood, poet
Krishna Sobti, Hindi Writer
Fakhar Zaman, writer and poet

Sport
 
 
Tanwir Afzal, Hong Kong cricketer.
Imtiaz Bhatti, Pakistani cyclist and a former Air Force pilot of Pakistan.
Mudassar Bukhari. Dutch cricketer.
Rizwan Cheema, Pakistani-Canadian cricketer.
Munir Dar, Hong Kong cricketer.

Actors/Actresses
 
 
Inayat Hussain Bhatti, film director and actor
Ejaz Durrani, actor
 Shagufta Ejaz, actress
 Sabiha Khanum, actress

Musicians
 
 
Adeel Chaudhry, also a dentist, actor, and model
 Alam Lohar, Punjabi folk singer
 Arif Lohar, Punjabi folk singer
Zoe Viccaji, Pakistani singer-songwriter and musical actress

Other
 
 
 The family of UK-born Shafilea Ahmed, an honour killing victim, originated from Uttam.

See also 
 List of populated places in Gujrat District

References

External links

 Gujrat, Pakistan
 District Gujrat, Pakistan
 Gujrat District

 
Districts of Punjab, Pakistan